The 2007 KNSB Dutch Single Distance Championships took place in Assen at De Smelt ice rink on 3–5 November 2006. Although this tournament was held in 2006 it was the 2006 edition as it was part of the 2006–2007 speed skating season.

Schedule

Medalists

Men

Source: www.schaatsen.nl  & SchaatsStatistieken.nl 

Notes:
500m
Smeekens surprised by winning the first race, Bos won the second race and overall classification. Simon Kuipers and Beorn Nijenhuis fell during the second race.
1000m
Jan Bos claims his second title of the Championships and his fifth title in two years.
1500m
Sven Kramer claims his second title of the Championships, while Bos was unable to defend the third of the three titles he won in 2005.
5000m
Defending champion Verheijen broke the track record before being overtaken by Kramer in the last pairings.
10,000m
Sven Kramer was named King of the Championships after his third title in a new track record.

Women

Source: www.schaatsen.nl  & SchaatsStatistieken.nl 

Notes:
500m
Boer surprised Timmer by unexpectedly winning both races overtaking all the favourites with a fair distance. Gerritsen who had the best pre-season disappointed.
1000m
Wüst successfully defended her title beating her opponents with a huge difference and a track record.
1500m
Wüst became Queen of the Championships with her third title. She finished way ahead of the other competitors, from who Renate Groenewold turned out to be the best.
3000m
Groenewold beats defending and 2006 Winter Olympics champion Wüst by less than a second, but in a new track record.
5000m
Smit took revenge on her weak 3000 m earlier in the week while the top-3 of that distance didn't participate in the 5000 m. Defending champion Kleibeuker won the bronze.

Men's results (details)

500 m

1000 m

1500 m

5000 m

10000 m

Women's results (details)

500 m

1000 m

1500 m

3000 m

5000 m

References

External links
Official website

D
Speed
2007 Single Distance
2007 KNSB Dutch Single Distance Championships